C. divisa  may refer to:
 Carex divisa, a sedge species in the genus Carex
 Crocothemis divisa, a dragonfly species found in Africa
 Cynips divisa, a gall forming wasp species

See also
 Divisa (disambiguation)